Bro Ardudwy is a Ministry Area of the Church in Wales located within the Meirionydd Synod area and is part of the Diocese of Bangor.

Initial formation
Bro Ardudwy Uchaf was formed by a decree from the Bishop of Bangor on 1 October 2011.  The decree dissolved the former Benefices and Parishes of:
 Harlech and Llanfair juxta Harlech
 Llanfihangel-y-Traethau and Llandecwyn
 LLanenddwyn (otherwise Dyffryn) with Llanddwywe
 Llanbedr with Llandanwg

The former Churches within Bro Ardudwy Uchaf were then raised to the status of Parish Churches within the area and consisted of:
 St Tanwg's Church, Harlech
 St Michael's Church, Ynys
 St Tecwyn's Church, Llandecwyn
 Christ Church, Talsarnau
 St Peter's Church, Llanbedr
 St Mary's Church, Llanfair
 St Tanwg's Church, Llandanwg
 St Enddwyn's Church, Dyffryn
 St Ddwywe's Church, Llanddwywe

The new Ministry Area was overseen by a Ministry Area Council that had the same powers as the former PCC's of the former Parishes.

Enlargement
On 3 September 2015 the Bishop of Bangor signed another decree that formed Bro Ardudwy and removed the portion of 'Uchaf' from its name.  The new area of Bro Ardudwy included all of the previous Churches but also included the Churches of the Benefice and Parishes of Llanaber with Barmouth and Caerdeon with Bontddu which were all raised to the status of Parish Churches.  The Parishes of Llanaber with Barmouth and Caerdeon with Bontddu were disbanded at the same time as the decree that formed Bro Ardudwy.

The Churches that were added to Bro Ardudwy included:
 St Mary and St Bodfan Church, Llanaber
 St David's Church, Barmouth
 St John's Church, Barmouth
 St Philip's Church, Caerdeon

The Ministry Area Council was enlarged to include extra members from the extra Churches making up the extended area of Bro Ardudwy.

Administration
Bro Ardudwy is a registered charity run by a Ministry Area Council whose members are trustees of the Charity.

Church in Wales